The Holsman Automobile Company was an early United States automobile manufacturer in Chicago, Illinois, between 1901 and 1910. Founded  by Henry K. Holsman, the company produced a high wheeler automobile.

Display models
 1902 is on display in Half Moon Bay, CA. Owned by James Holsman, a descendent of Henry Holsman.
 The Western Development Museum in Moose Jaw, Saskatchewan, has a 1902 Holsman on display.
 A 1902 Holsman is on display at the Louwman Museum in The Hague, Netherlands.
 A 1902 model is on display at the Island County Historical museum in Coupeville, Washington State, USA.
 A 1903 model is on display at the Automovil Club Argentino, Buenos Aires.
 A 1903 model is on display at the Henry Ford Museum Detroit, Michigan.
A 1903 model is on display at the Tellus Science Museum near Cartersville, Georgia
 A 1904 model is on display at the Manitoba Antique Automobile Museum.
 A 1905 model is on display at the Gryf Technical Museum in Dąbrówka, Poland.
 A 1907 model is on display at the Southward Car Museum in New Zealand.
 Another 1907 model is held at the Burwell Museum in Cambridgeshire, England, United Kingdom, possibly the only 1907 Holsman in the UK.
 A third 1907 Model 3 is located at the Des Chutes Historical Center in Bend, Oregon. Believed to the first automobile in the town, it was being restored to running condition as of November 2015.
 A 1908 model is on display at the Technical museum of Vadim Zadorozhny in Arkhangelskoye, Moscow Oblast, Russia.
 A 1908 "Model 10" is on display at the National Truck and Auto Museum in Auburn, Indiana.
 A 1908 model is currently being restored by students enrolled in the Automotive Restoration Program at McPherson College.
 A 1908 model is part of the Reynolds-Alberta Museum collection.
 A 1909 Holsman is on display at the Gilmore Car Museum in Hickory Corners, Michigan.
 One example can be seen at the Cloud County Historical Museum in Concordia, Kansas.
 There is one on display at Seattle's Museum of History and Industry.
 There is one on display at the Kittitas County Museum in Ellensburg, WA

Gallery

References

External links
 Company history at secondchancegarage.com
 HolsmanAutomobile.com
 Sothward Museum
 Gryf Museum

Motor vehicle manufacturers based in Illinois
Defunct motor vehicle manufacturers of the United States
Manufacturing companies based in Chicago
1900s cars
1910s cars
Vehicle manufacturing companies established in 1901
Vehicle manufacturing companies disestablished in 1910
Brass Era vehicles
Veteran vehicles
1901 establishments in Illinois
1910 disestablishments in Illinois

Highwheeler